The 2014–15 VCU Rams men's basketball team represented Virginia Commonwealth University during the 2014–15 NCAA Division I men's basketball season. It was the 47th season of the University fielding a men's basketball program. Led by sixth-year head coach Shaka Smart, they continued to play their home games at the Stuart C. Siegel Center. They were a member of the Atlantic 10 Conference. They finished the season 26–10, 12–6 in A-10 play to finish in a tie for fourth place. They defeated Fordham, Richmond, Davidson, and Dayton to become champions of the Atlantic 10 tournament. They received an automatic bid to the NCAA tournament where they lost in the second round to Ohio State.

Previous season
The 2013–14 VCU Rams finished the season with an overall record of 26–9, with a record of 12–4 in the Atlantic 10 regular season for second-place finish. In the 2014 Atlantic 10 tournament, the Rams were defeated by Saint Joseph's, 65–61 in the championship game. They were invited to the 2014 NCAA Division I men's basketball tournament which they lost in the second round to Stephen F. Austin.

Off season

Departures

2014–15 incoming team members

2014–15 team recruits

Roster

Schedule 

|-
!colspan=9 style="background:#000000; color:#F8B800;"| Exhibition

|-
!colspan=9 style="background:#000000; color:#F8B800;"| Non-conference regular season

|-
!colspan=9 style="background:#000000; color:#F8B800;"| Atlantic 10 regular season

|-
!colspan=9 style="background:#E11B1A; color:#FFFFFF;"| Atlantic 10 Tournament

|-
!colspan=9 style="background:#007FFF; text:#ffffff;"| NCAA tournament

Rankings

References 

VCU
VCU Rams men's basketball seasons
VCU Rams
VCU
VCU Rams